Hekal is a village and a former municipality in the Fier County, southwestern Albania. At the 2015 local government reform it became a subdivision of the municipality Mallakastër. The population at the 2011 census was 2,623.

Notable people 
Rrapo Hekali Albanian leader of the uprising of 1847
Dervish Hekali Albanian hero.

References 

Former municipalities in Fier County
Administrative units of Mallakastër
Villages in Fier County